Jacquelina Alvarez (born 21 August 1989) is an Argentine professional racing cyclist. She rides for the Lotto-Soudal Ladies team.

See also
 List of 2015 UCI Women's Teams and riders

References

External links

1989 births
Living people
Argentine female cyclists
Place of birth missing (living people)
21st-century Argentine women